Hillsboro Stadium is a multi-sport stadium in the northwest United States, located in Hillsboro, Oregon, a suburb west of Portland. Opened  in 1999 and owned by the city of Hillsboro, the award-winning stadium is part of the Gordon Faber Recreation Complex located in the northeast part of the city, adjacent to the Sunset Highway.

The facility hosts home football games for Portland State University, plus state playoff games for the Oregon School Activities Association's smaller school divisions. Hillsboro Stadium is also used for baseball, softball, soccer, and lacrosse and has hosted college and professional teams. Hillsboro Stadium is used for the NWAPA's annual Century Showcase. The adjacent Hillsboro Ballpark (now Ron Tonkin Field) opened in 2013.

The covered main grandstand and press box are along the southwest sideline.

History
The stadium cost $7.5 million to build, and opened in August 1999; the entire sports complex cost $10 million to build, with funding from the city and the Ronler Acres urban renewal district. The first high school football game at Hillsboro Stadium was on September 17, 1999, when Century played Oregon City. Previously, Century had used Hare Field after the school opened in 1997, sharing that stadium with Hillsboro and Glencoe high schools.

In 2000, the facility was expanded to increase the seating capacity from 4,000 to the current 7,000 plus. An additional 3,000 temporary seats were added at that time as well to accommodate the Portland State football team. The team used Hillsboro Stadium in 2000 when Civic Stadium (now Providence Park) was being renovated. Portland's Central Catholic High School also played their home games at the stadium that season as well. In May 2001, the University of Oregon Ducks held their annual spring football game at the stadium, which included future NFL quarterbacks Joey Harrington and Jason Fife.

In October 2005, Hillsboro Stadium hosted a college football game between Southern Oregon University (SOU) and Pacific Lutheran University (PLU) in a neutral site contest between the NCAA Division III PLU and NAIA SOU. During the 2007 season, Pacific University’s baseball and softball teams used the stadium while their new facility was being built in Forest Grove. In June 2008, the opening ceremonies of the Special Olympics Oregon Summer Games were held at the facility.

In 2008, the stadium hosted a regular season game between the Philadelphia Barrage and the New Jersey Pride of Major League Lacrosse (MLL) on August 9. New Jersey won the game with attendance totaling 3,687 people. Hillsboro Stadium is mentioned as the likely home of any MLL team that may be awarded to or relocate to Portland. The annual Les Schwab Bowl for high school football all stars was played at the stadium since 2009.

In February 2010, the original AstroTurf of 1999 was replaced with FieldTurf. The renovation cost $988,000, of which the school district covered $250,000 of those costs.

Portland State again used Hillsboro Stadium in May 2010 for its spring football game, and held its four home games there during the 2010 season, while PGE Park (now Providence Park) underwent a remodel to prepare for Major League Soccer. Also due to those renovations, Central Catholic High School played its home football games at Hillsboro Stadium. In March 2012, the city announced it was exploring the addition of a baseball stadium at the complex in hopes of adding a minor league baseball team.

Portland State played one game at Hillsboro in 2015, when Providence Park was unavailable due to its use as a Portland Timbers venue. The Vikings returned for four games in 2018, with only one at Providence Park. In that season, the Vikings not only faced conflicts with the Timbers, but also with the Timbers' NWSL sister team, the Portland Thorns; the NWSL championship game; and stadium expansion. All six PSU home games in 2019 were scheduled for Hillsboro.

Facility
Designed by GBD Architects and built by Hoffman Construction Company, the stadium was named one of 1999's Best Public Project Award recipients by AIA Western International. The facility also won the 2000 Design Award of Merit from International Illumination Design Award. Hillsboro Stadium has a  FieldTurf field. This field is large enough to accommodate two games at the same time. The main grandstand is on the southwest side of the field and contains locker rooms, concession stands, and team training facilities. Seating capacity is approximately 7,600, and the main covered grandstand seats 4,000.

The FieldTurf field is used for a variety of sports. These include lacrosse, football, soccer, baseball, and softball. The main use is for high school athletics for Hillsboro’s four high schools, primarily Century. The stadium also hosts other events such as foot races, OSAA state football playoffs, Cyclocross (Cross Crusade), expositions for rally cars, and high school band competitions.

See also
List of sports venues in Portland, Oregon
Shute Park
Noble Woods Park
Hondo Dog Park

References

External links
Gordon Faber Recreation Complex 

Sports venues in Hillsboro, Oregon
Portland State Vikings football
American football venues in Oregon
Lacrosse venues in the United States
Former Major League Lacrosse venues
Soccer venues in Oregon
Softball venues in Portland, Oregon
Ultimate (sport) venues
High school sports in Oregon
High school football venues in the United States
Sports venues completed in 1999
1999 establishments in Oregon